The People's Choice Casino was a club located at 805 West Owens on the West Side of Las Vegas, Nevada.

History 
Sarann Knight-Preddy and her husband Joe bought the business which was called Woody's Supper Club and changed the name to Sarann's Supper Club. She wanted to build an up-scale dining club, but realized that the kitchen was too small and the expense of supplies would make the food too costly, so Preddy decided to convert it into a casino. She renamed it again to the People's Choice Casino, got a gaming license and put in some poker and blackjack tables. 

The casino had a license for blackjack, poker and slot machines and Preddy owned it around seven years. It is unknown when the business closed. It was still listed as a business operation in the 1989 phone book and when Clarence Ray was interviewed for the University of Nevada's Oral History Program, he stated it was still open in 1991.

References

Sources

Defunct nightclubs in the Las Vegas Valley
1980 establishments in Nevada
1991 disestablishments in Nevada
Defunct casinos in the Las Vegas Valley
West Las Vegas
Supper clubs